Einer Harry Gregersen (7 July 1901 – 3 September 1970) was a Danish coxswain. He competed at the 1928 Summer Olympics in Amsterdam with the men's eight where they were eliminated in round two.

References

1901 births
1970 deaths
Danish male rowers
Olympic rowers of Denmark
Rowers at the 1928 Summer Olympics
People from Holbæk Municipality
Coxswains (rowing)
Rowers at the 1936 Summer Olympics
European Rowing Championships medalists
Sportspeople from Region Zealand